Visakhapatnam North Assembly constituency  is a constituency in Vishakhapatnam district of Andhra Pradesh, representing the state legislative assembly in India. It is one of the seven assembly segments of Visakhapatnam (Lok Sabha constituency), along with Bheemili, Visakhapatnam East, Visakhapatnam South, Visakhapatnam West and Gajuwaka. Ganta Srinivasa Rao is the present MLA of the constituency, who won the 2019 Andhra Pradesh Legislative Assembly election from Telugu Desam Party. , there a total of 280,151 electors in the constituency.

Mandals 
The mandal and wards that forms the assembly constituency are:

Members of Legislative Assembly Visakhapatnam North

Election results

Assembly Elections 2009

Assembly elections 2014

Assembly elections 2019

See also 
 List of constituencies of the Andhra Pradesh Legislative Assembly

References 

Assembly constituencies of Andhra Pradesh